Below is a contemporary list of all major proposed railway stations in Wales.

Only stations which have been proposed by Transport for Wales and/or Network Rail, or which are state approved but private funded proposals (such as Cardiff Parkway) are shown.

List of proposed railway stations

South East Wales

Cardiff area 

 Cardiff Parkway railway station - by 2024 
 Crwys Road railway station - by December 2023
 Ely Mill railway station - on the Welsh Government New Railway Station Prioritisation (a five station shortlist)
 Gabalfa railway station - by 2028
 Loudoun Square railway station - Spring 2024
Treforest Estate railway station relocation - by December 2025

Newport area 

 Llanwern railway station - date to be confirmed
Magor railway station - proposed reopening of the station that closed in 1964, date to be confirmed
Newport East railway station - date to be confirmed
Newport West railway station - date to be confirmed

South West Wales

Carmarthenshire area 

St Clears railway station (Carmarthenshire) – proposed reopening of the station that closed in 1964. On the Welsh Government New Railway Station Prioritisation (a five station shortlist)

Swansea area 

West Wales Parkway railway station (Swansea) - proposed, date to be confirmed

Mid Wales

Powys area 

 Carno railway station (Powys) - on the Welsh Government New Railway Station Prioritisation (a five station shortlist)

North Wales

Flintshire area 
Broughton railway station, Flintshire  - on the 2021 Metro Development Plan by Transport for Wales and Future developments plan for the North Wales Metro
Greenfield railway station, Flintshire (on site of former Holywell Junction railway station) - on the 2021 Metro Development Plan and Future developments plan for the North Wales Metro by Transport for Wales
Northern Gateway railway station or Deeside Parkway railway station (Deeside) - on the Welsh Government New Railway Station Prioritisation (a five station shortlist)

Wrexham area 
Wrexham North railway station - on 2021 Metro Development Plan and Future developments plan for the North Wales Metro by Transport for Wales
Wrexham South railway station - on 2021 Metro Development Plan and Future developments plan for the North Wales Metro by Transport for Wales

Proposed reopening of Anglesey Central Railway line

Central Anglesey area 
Amlwch railway station - part of the Future developments plan for the North Wales Metro by Transport for Wales
Gaerwen railway station - part of the Future developments plan for the North Wales Metro by Transport for Wales
Llangefni railway station - part of a April 2019 New Rail Stations Prioritisation – Stage 2 Assessment Report, by the Welsh Government, likely part of any reopening of ACR.

See also 

 List of proposed railway stations in England
 List of proposed railway stations in Scotland
 South Wales Metro
 North Wales Metro

References 

Railway stations in Wales